The 2016 Morelos Open was a professional tennis tournament played on outdoor hard courts. It was the third (ATP) and second (ITF) editions of the tournament, which was part of the 2016 ATP Challenger Tour and the 2016 ITF Women's Circuit, offering prize money of $50,000 (ATP) and $25,000 (ITF) on 15–21 February 2016.

ATP singles main draw entrants

Seeds 

 1 Rankings as of 8 February 2016.

Other entrants 
The following players received wildcards into the singles main draw:
  Mauricio Astorga
  Lucas Gómez
  Tigre Hank
  Luis Patiño

The following players gained entry into the singles main draw as an alternate:
  Sekou Bangoura
  Juan Ignacio Londero

The following player gained entry into the singles main draw as a lucky loser:
  Gerard Granollers

The following players received entry from the qualifying draw:
  Nicolás Barrientos 
  Gonzalo Escobar 
  Marinko Matosevic
  Peter Polansky

ITF singles main draw entrants

Seeds 

 1 Rankings as of 8 February 2016.

Other entrants 
The following players received wildcards into the singles main draw:
  Alexia Coutiño Castillo
  Beatriz Magdalena Flores
  Daniela Morales Beckmann
  María José Portillo Ramírez

The following players received entry from the qualifying draw:
  Nicole Coopersmith
  Jaqueline Cristian
  Elizaveta Ianchuk
  Madeleine Kobelt
  Nika Kukharchuk
  Evgeniya Levashova
  Melissa Morales
  Zoë Gwen Scandalis

The following player received entry by a lucky loser spot:
  Shelby Talcott

Champions

Men's singles 

 Gerald Melzer def.  Alejandro González, 7–6(7–4), 6–3

Women's singles 
  Marie Bouzková def.  Lauren Albanese, 0–6, 6–0, 6–1

Men's doubles 

 Philip Bester /  Peter Polansky def.  Marcelo Arévalo /  Sergio Galdós, 6–4, 3–6, [10–6]

Women's doubles
 Aleksandrina Naydenova /  Fanny Stollár def.  Elizaveta Ianchuk /  Kateřina Kramperová, 6–3, 6–2

External links 
 2016 Morelos Open at ITFtennis.com

2016
Morelos Open
2016 ITF Women's Circuit
Hard court tennis tournaments
Mex